Biomphalaria sudanica is a species of air-breathing freshwater snail, an aquatic pulmonate gastropod mollusk in the family Planorbidae, the ram's horn snails.

Distribution 
This species is African, and occurs mainly in East Africa:
 Lake Victoria, Kenya, Uganda, (Tanzania)
 Lake Ziway, Ethiopia
 Lake Albert, Uganda. (Lake Albert is between Uganda and Democratic Republic of the Congo)
 Lake Kyoga, Uganda
 13 crater lakes in western Uganda (listed as "Biomphalaria pfeifferi/sudanica" in these crater lakes)

Phylogeny 
A cladogram showing the phylogenic relations of species in the genus Biomphalaria:

Ecology 
Biomphalaria sudanica is found in shallow water near the shoreline in Lake Albert. Despite being a pulmonate, Biomphalaria sudanica is well adapted to use the oxygen from water (but not as well as Planorbis). This ability is useful for living in swamp habitats.

The population density of Biomphalaria sudanica varies during the year. The highest population density of Biomphalaria sudanica is in Lake Ziway, Ethiopia from June to August, at the end of rainy season.

The higher densities of Biomphalaria sudanica occur in habitats with the Common Water Hyacinth Eichhornia crassipes in Lake Victoria.

It was experimentally detected under laboratory conditions that shells of Biomphalaria sudanica are bigger in waters with higher concentration of calcium than in waters with low calcium.

Parasites 
Biomphalaria sudanica is an intermediate host for Schistosoma mansoni and for Schistosoma rodhaini.

Infestation with schistosomes in the Lake Victoria basin is about 1%, but can be up to 50% in the case of Schistosoma mansoni and up to 6% in Schistosoma rodhaini in some localities.

References

Further reading 
 

Biomphalaria
Gastropods described in 1870